Andrew N. "Drew" Baur (April 25, 1944 – February 20, 2011) was a co-owner of the St. Louis Cardinals baseball team. Baur was a key member of the ownership group which purchased the team from Anheuser-Busch in March 1996. Baur served as the team's treasurer, and was a member of the Cardinals Board of Directors.

Early life

Baur was born in St. Louis, Missouri, where he attended St. Louis Country Day School. He graduated from Washington and Lee University, and then earned his M.B.A. from Georgia State University. A huge Cardinals fan, he attended high school with Cardinals chairman Bill DeWitt Jr. The two remained lifetime friends, with DeWitt investing in Baur's bank and later joining Baur's group which acquired
the Cardinals.

Banking career

Baur was a major player in the banking industry in the St. Louis area during his lifetime, serving as chairman of Southwest Bank and Country Bank of St. Louis. Baur and another Cardinals board member, Fred Hanser, put together the deal which formed Mississippi Valley Bancshares, a bank holding company, in 1984. Southwest Bank became one of its subsidiaries.
Baur was also the former president and chairman of Commerce Bank of St. Louis, and Mercantile Trust Company N.A.

Personal life

Baur died of a heart attack at his home in Gulf Stream, Florida, on February 20, 2011. Baur was survived by three children and seven grandchildren.

References

Businesspeople from St. Louis
St. Louis Cardinals executives
1944 births
2011 deaths
People from Gulf Stream, Florida
20th-century American businesspeople